Sidney W. A. Dekker (born 1969, "near Amsterdam"), is a professor at Griffith University in Brisbane, Australia, where he founded the Safety Science Innovation Lab. He is also Honorary Professor of Psychology at the University of Queensland.

Previously, Dekker was Professor of human factors and system safety at Lund University in Sweden, where he founded the Leonardo da Vinci Laboratory for Complexity and Systems Thinking, and flew as First Officer on Boeing 737s for Sterling and later Cimber Airlines out of Copenhagen. Dekker is a high-profile scholar (h-index = 48) and is known for his work in the fields of human factors and safety.

Publications

Books
 Foundations of Safety Science: A century of understanding accidents and disasters (2019)
 The Safety Anarchist: Relying on human expertise and innovation, reducing bureaucracy and compliance (2017)
 The End of Heaven: Disaster and Suffering in a Scientific Age (2017)
 Just Culture: Restoring Trust and Accountability in your Organization (2016)
 Safety Differently: Human Factors for a New Era (2015)
 The Field Guide to Understanding Human Error (2014)
 Second Victim: Error, guilt, trauma and resilience (2013)
 Just Culture: Balancing Safety and Accountability (2012)
 Drift into Failure: From hunting broken components to understanding complex systems (2011)
 Patient Safety: A human factors approach (2011)

Documentary
Safety Differently: The Movie – in collaboration with Brisbane-based RideFree Media, Sidney directed and presented his debut documentary in 2017.

References

External links
 Leonardo da Vinci Laboratory for Complexity and Systems Thinking official website

1969 births
Living people
Dutch aviators
Dutch expatriates in Australia
Dutch expatriates in Sweden
Dutch psychologists
Academic staff of Griffith University
Academic staff of Lund University